Strike Up the Band may refer to:

 Strike Up the Band (musical), a 1927 Broadway musical with music by George and Ira Gershwin
 "Strike Up the Band" (song), a song from the musical
 Strike Up the Band (film), a 1940 musical film starring Judy Garland and Mickey Rooney
 Strike Up the Band (Tony Bennett and Count Basie album), an album by Tony Bennett with Count Basie and his Orchestra
 Strike Up the Band (Red Garland album)
 "Strike Up the Band", a song by Poison from Native Tongue
 Strike! Up the Band, an album by The Scaramanga Six
 "Strike Up the Band (Here Comes a Sailor)" a 1900 song by Andrew B. Sterling and Charles B. Ward